Kedjenou (also known as Kedjenou poulet and Kedjenou de Poulet) is a spicy stew that is slow-cooked in a sealed canari (terra-cotta pot) over fire or coals and prepared with chicken or guinea hen and vegetables. It is a traditional and popular dish of the cuisine of Côte d'Ivoire.

Preparation methods for the stew vary. Sometimes little or no added liquid is used in its preparation, allowing the meat to cook in its own juices, which tenderizes the meat and concentrates the flavors of the ingredients. Sometimes the dish is cooked in a wrapped and sealed banana leaf that is placed under hot coals. In Côte d'Ivoire the dish is traditionally served with Attiéké, a side dish made with grated cassava.

See also
 Ivorian cuisine - the cuisine of Côte d'Ivoire
 List of African dishes
 List of stews

References

Further reading
 
 

Meat stews
Ivorian cuisine
Chicken dishes
Chili pepper dishes